The Continental Cup 2012–13 was the 16th edition of the IIHF Continental Cup. The season started on 28 September 2012, and finished on 13 January, 2013.

The Super Final was played in Donetsk, Ukraine on the 11–13 January 2013.

The points system used in this tournament was: the winner in regular time won 3 points, the loser 0 points; in case of a tie, an overtime and a penalty shootout is played, the winner in penalty shootouts or overtime won 2 points and the loser won 1 point.

First Group Stage

Group A
(Miercurea Ciuc, Romania)

Group A standings

Second Group Stage

Group B
(Landshut, Germany)

Group B standings

Group C
(Vaasa, Finland)

Group C standings

Third Group Stage

Group D
(Bolzano, Italy)

Group D standings

Group E
(DNB Arena, Stavanger, Norway)

Group E standings

Final stage

Final Group
(Donetsk, Ukraine)

Final Group standings

References

External links
 Official IIHF tournament page

2012–13 in European ice hockey
IIHF Continental Cup
Sport in Donetsk
2013 in Ukrainian sport